Brachychiton sp. Ormeau is a rare and endangered rainforest tree of the genus Brachychiton found in Queensland, Australia.

Description 
A species of Brachychiton, a tree reaching up to 25 metres in height, The leaves are dropped during dry seasons, a time when the species favours for reproduction, and return as pale to coppery coloured new growth. The flowering period is during September, the profuse display of green to white bell-shaped flowers appearing at the terminus of the branches;the width of each flower is around 10 mm. Fruiting pods appear around January to February, these are 3 cm long, brown, and boat-shaped. During the later stages of growth the trunk begins to form an exaggerated bottle-shape, and the leaves alter from a deeply lobed shape, divided from five to nine times, to a glossy and often elliptical leaf 12 to 20 centimetres long.

The tree is capable of attaining a long life, somewhere over 120 years. Sexual maturity is reached after around twenty years.

Distribution and range 
The Ormeau bottle trees are largely restricted in range, extending over 6.5 km2 and have a very low population in an area of occupancy that is less than one square kilometre. The largest stand is regarded as the most viable population, recorded as 131 plants located in a conservation area. Two reproducing groups were found in a location that contains fewer than ten trees; other individuals occur as non-seeding outliers within the total population of 161 trees.

Conservation 
The main group occurs within an 'environmental park', the Wongawallan Conservation Area in the rural suburb of Wongawallan, Queensland, where it is afforded some protection from threatening factors. The small groups outside this area are located on a lease for proposed quarries. The national government named this tree as one of thirty plants to be the given the highest priority for protection from extinction, and that its status be improved by the year 2020. The major threats identified are habitat loss, fire, insect and weed infestation and the remaining genetic diversity of their low numbers.

References

Ormeau
Malvales of Australia
Trees of Australia
Flora of Queensland
Undescribed plant species